Anjean is an unincorporated community in Greenbrier County, West Virginia, United States.

The name Anjean is an amalgamation of Ann and Jean, the relatives of a mine proprietor.

References

Unincorporated communities in Greenbrier County, West Virginia
Unincorporated communities in West Virginia
Coal towns in West Virginia